Luis Gamarra (born 23 July 1956) is a Bolivian sports shooter. He competed at the 1984 Summer Olympics and the 1992 Summer Olympics.

References

1956 births
Living people
Bolivian male sport shooters
Olympic shooters of Bolivia
Shooters at the 1984 Summer Olympics
Shooters at the 1992 Summer Olympics
Sportspeople from Buenos Aires